This list of burials at Southern Cemetery, Manchester covers notable people who have been interred at the municipal burial ground in Manchester, North West England. 



Map

Burials

References

External links

 
 

Southern Cemetery, Manchester
Manchester-related lists